Julito Buhisan Cortes (born July 4, 1956) is a prelate of the Catholic Church in the Philippines.  He is the current Bishop of Dumaguete in Negros Oriental, Philippines since September 2013. Before his appointment to the See of Dumaguete, Cortes was the Auxiliary Bishop of Cebu from 2002 to 2013.

Early life 
Although born in Parañaque, Manila on 4 July 1956, Julito Buhisan Cortes is a native of Siquijor, Siquijor. He is the eldest of seven children.

Education 
He finished his elementary studies at Pulangyuta Elementary School (1968) in Siquijor and his high school studies at Saint Joseph Seminary (1972) in Dumaguete. He obtained his Bachelor of Arts in Philosophy degree from San Carlos Seminary College (1976) in Cebu and his Bachelor's degree in Theology at the University of Santo Tomas (1976) in Manila.

Priesthood 
He was ordained to the priesthood on 24 October 1980 at the Cathedral of Saint Catherine of Alexandria, Dumaguete, and was assigned by Epifanio Surban, first Bishop of Dumaguete, to Saint Joseph Seminary as teacher, formator, principal, and academic dean at a time when the seminary was transitioning from a high school seminary to the college seminary that it is now.

Further Education and Higher Studies 
During summers, Cortes continued his studies at the University of Santo Tomas and finished his Licentiate in Sacred Theology (1983) and Master of Arts in Higher Religious Education (1983). After several years in seminary formation work, he proceeded with advanced studies at the Angelicum University in Rome where he obtained a Doctorate in Sacred Theology (1986). This period of academic studies also enabled him to attend international courses such as “Fostering Human Religious Development” at the Gregorian University in Rome (1986) and “Bible and the Holy Land” at Saint George's College in Jerusalem, Israel (1988). Years later, he also attended a course on “Leadership in a Participatory Church” at the East Asian Pastoral Institute, Quezon City (1996).

Presbyteral Ministry 
Upon his return to the diocese, he was assigned by Angel Lagdameo, second Bishop of Dumaguete, as rector of Saint Joseph Seminary and later appointed him Vicar General as well (1989). He also became parish priest of the Heritage town of Bacong (1997). When Lagdameo convoked the first Diocesan Synod of Dumaguete (1992), he entrusted the task of presiding officer to Cortes. These administrative functions in the diocese gave Cortes an invaluable opportunity to be delegate to two historic ecclesial events in the Philippine Church, the Second Plenary Council of the Philippines (1991) and the National Pastoral Consultation on Church Renewal (2001). When Lagdameo was promoted as Archbishop of Jaro (2000), Cortes became the diocesan administrator of Dumaguete until the arrival of the third Bishop of Dumaguete, John Du (2001). A few months later, Pope John Paul II appointed Cortes as Auxiliary Bishop of Cebu and Titular Bishop of Severiana. His episcopal ordination was held at the Dumaguete Cathedral on 8 January 2002.

Episcopacy

Auxiliary Bishop 
Cortes served as Auxiliary Bishop of Cebu as well as parish priest of Santo Rosario Parish (the “Quiapo of Cebu”) from January 2002 until November 2013, for almost twelve years, allowing him vast pastoral experiences and opportunities under the tutelage of two Archbishops of Cebu, Ricardo J. Cardinal Vidal and his successor Jose S. Palma. Aside from responsibilities in the Archdiocese of Cebu, Cortes also served as chairman of CBCP Permanent Committee for the Cultural Heritage of the Church from 2007 to 2013, as well as being a member of two other Commissions (Culture and Liturgy).

Bishop of Dumaguete 
On 28 September 2013, Feast of San Lorenzo Ruiz, Pope Francis, appointed Cortes as the fourth Bishop of the Diocese of Dumaguete. His canonical installation and possession of the See of Dumaguete was on 5 December 2013 at the Cathedral of St. Catherine of Alexandria, Dumaguete.

References

1956 births
21st-century Roman Catholic bishops in the Philippines
Living people
Pontifical University of Saint Thomas Aquinas alumni
University of Santo Tomas alumni
People from Siquijor